Siruvalur is a village in Ariyalur district, Tamil Nadu, India. The village has its own government high school which it is planning to upgrade to a higher secondary school. Siruvalur is located at 1 km from National Highway 227 (India) Tiruchirapalli to Chidambaram. Siruvalur is 12 km from district headquarters Ariyalur .

Demographics 
As per the 2011 census, Siruvalur had a  population of 2,479 with 1,177 males and 1,302 females.

Temples 
This village is surrounded by many temples. Lord Shiva, Vinayagar, Mariamman, and Ellaiamman temples are located in a single complex near the entrance. The other side of the village has another temple complex. Within it are the Dhraupadiamman, Karupusami, Aiyanar, and Vallalar adigal temples. A separate temple for Karupusami is located in the north of the village.

Community 
The village consists of Udyar, Reddiyar, and Vaniyar communities.

Economy 
The economy of Siruvalur is mainly based on agriculture. Most of the population in the village depends on agriculture. Some of them are employed in the cement factories around the village on daily wage. The main cultivation is paddy, cotton, maze, sugar cane, and the Casuarina Tree. Siruvalur has two rivers flowing parallel to it. One is originating in Mathura Kaliamman Temple, Siruvachur and another is from Kallankurichi Kaliyuga Varatharaja Perumal temple. These two rivers join together in Siruvalur to flow as a single river that joins with Kollidam river. Many educated young people work in cities like Chennai and Bangalore. Also some people work in Singapore and the Middle East.

References 

Villages in Ariyalur district